Hormurus boholiensis is a species of scorpion in the Hormuridae family. It is endemic to New Caledonia. It was first described in 1877 by French naturalist Eugène Simon.

References

 

 
neocaledonicus
Fauna of New Caledonia
Taxa named by Eugène Simon
Animals described in 1877